AgeX Therapeutics, Inc. (commonly abbreviated as AgeX Therapeutics or simply AgeX) is an American biotechnology company developing medical therapeutics related to human longevity. It was founded in 2017 by Michael D. West, initially as a subsidiary of BioTime, Inc. with backing from British billionaire investor Jim Mellon and others.

The chairman is Gregory Bailey, who was an early backer and board member of Medivation until its acquisition by Pfizer in 2016 for $14 billion.

In January 2020, AgeX Therapeutics announced a research collaboration with a Japanese biopharma company utilizing AgeX's UniverCyte technology platform.

External links

References

Companies based in Alameda, California
Biogerontology organizations
Health care companies based in California
Biotechnology companies of the United States
Technology companies established in 2017
Life extension organizations